The lateral root of median nerve is one of the two sources of the median nerve.

Nerves of the upper limb